Rahimabad-e Kamin (also Romanized as Raḩīmābād-e Kamīn; also known as Raḩīmābād) is a village in Kamin Rural District, in the Central District of Pasargad County, Fars Province, Iran. At the 2006 census, its population was 28, in 6 families.

References 

Populated places in Pasargad County